Tallabogue may refer to:

Tallabogue (Leaf River tributary), a stream in Mississippi
Tallabogue (Tuscolameta Creek tributary), a stream in Mississippi
Tallabogue Creek (Chickasawhay River tributary), a stream in Mississippi